This page lists the final standings of the World Marathon Majors (and current standings of latest series), which was founded in 2006 and is made up of six annual races: the Boston Marathon, London Marathon, Berlin Marathon, Chicago Marathon, New York City Marathon and Tokyo Marathon (which was added to the World Marathon Majors in 2013). The New York City Marathon was cancelled in 2012, and consequently is not included for the 2011–12 or 2012–13 seasons. In years where the World Athletics Championships or Olympic Games are contested, the marathon at the respective event is also included.

Each World Marathon Majors series originally spanned two full calendar years; the second year of a series overlapped with the first year of the next. Starting in 2015, each series began with a defined city race and ended with the following race in the same city. So, series IX started in February 2015 at the 2015 Tokyo Marathon and ended there in February 2016 at the 2016 Tokyo Marathon. Series X started at the 2016 Boston Marathon and finished at the 2017 Boston Marathon. Series XI started at the 2017 London Marathon and finished at the 2018 London Marathon.

Winners by season
The winners by season listed below.

Men's series winners

Women's series winners

Men's wheelchair series winners

Women's wheelchair series winners

Standings by season 
The leaderboards show all top placing finishers for the given season.

Points systems
From 2006–07 until 2013–14 points were given for 1st place: 25 points, 2nd: 15 points, 3rd: 10 points, 4th: 5 points, 5th: 1 point.
From series IX (season 2014–15) onwards points were given for 1st place: 25 points, 2nd: 16 points, 3rd: 9 points, 4th: 4 points, 5th: 1 point.

2006–07 (series I)

2007–08 (series II)

 Irina Mikitenko was named a winner by vote of WMM race directors

2008–09 (series III)

2009–10 (series IV)

 Liliya Shobukhova from Russia (initially 85 pts) was disqualified due to the doping case.

2010–11 (series V)

 Liliya Shobukhova from Russia (initially 90 pts) was disqualified due to the doping case.

2011–12 (series VI)

2012–13 (series VII)

2013–14 (series VIII)

 Rita Jeptoo (Kenya) was removed because of a September 2014 doping violation.

2015–16 (series IX)

 Mary Keitany was named a winner by vote of WMM race directors

2016–17 (series X)

2017–18 (series XI)

 Mary Keitany awarded first place over Tirunesh Dibaba because of better head-to-head record.
 Yuki Kawauchi and Brigid Kosgei were awarded third place on a race director's vote.

2018–19 (series XII)

 Lelisa Desisa was awarded second place on a race director's vote.

2019–21 (series XIII)

See also
 World Marathon Majors
 IAAF Road Race Label Events
 List of World Athletics Label marathon races

Notes

References

External links
 

Lists of marathon winners